= Visions Metro Weekly =

American newspaper

- Type: Weekly newspaper
- Format: Tabloid
- Owner: Mission Do It
- Publisher: Howard J. Scott
- Editor: Howard J. Scott, Lynda Levine
- Founded: 1982
- Headquarters: Newark, New Jersey
- Circulation: 25,000
- Price: $156 subscription (US dollars)
- Website: http://www.visionsmetro.com/ Website = http://rpnfac.com/

Visions Metro Weekly is an alternative newspaper that focuses on local-interest stories. It is distributed often free of charge across New Jersey and neighboring New York City, particularly Harlem. The publisher and editor-in-chief of this Newark, New Jersey–based weekly is Howard J. Scott, born in 1958 in New Rochelle, New York. He is also one of the partners at Legacy Media Group as well as a political and social activist and an entrepreneur.

The paper, known formerly as Visions, and dedicated to covering the African-American heritage, was founded by Howard J. Scott in 1982 with his twin brother John H. Scott. Its motto is Positive news for a change, meaning that no reports about violence are included in it. Visions Weekly has 25,000 copies in print every week. It is often distributed freely across New Jersey and especially around Harlem in New York City. Most articles are written by Scott himself. The magazine does not show much profit and is financed mostly by his own business. The paper is also known as Twin Visions or Newark Weekly News.
